Chattogram Development Authority (CDA) is a self-governing organization in Chittagong, Bangladesh which is responsible for implementing the city's master plan. It was established by the government in 1959 to manage the city's growth and drew up a master plan to be reviewed every five years to plan its urban development.

Area covered
According to the structure plan-1995 1152 sq km.

Boundaries 
 In North: Bansbaria of Sitakunda
 In South: Sangu River, Anwara
 In East: Ichakhali of Rangunia
 In West: Bay of Bengal

References

Government of Chittagong
1959 establishments in East Pakistan
Government agencies of Bangladesh
Organisations based in Chittagong
Urban development authorities in Bangladesh